Yangling Dorje (born April 1931) is a Chinese politician of Tibetan ethnicity who served as chairman of the Tibet Autonomous Regional Committee of the Chinese People's Political Consultative Conference from 1983 to 1986 and vice chairman of the Sichuan Provincial Committee of the Chinese People's Political Consultative Conference from 1986 to 1998. 

He was a delegate to the 7th National People's Congress and an alternate members of the 12th Central Committee of the Chinese Communist Party.

Biography
Yangling Dorje was born in Batang County, Xikang, in April 1931.

He entered the workforce in September 1949, and joined the Chinese Communist Party in October of that same year. In 1957, he became an alternate member of the Central Committee of the Communist Youth League of China. He was first party secretary of Ngawa Tibetan and Qiang Autonomous Prefecture in 1975, and held that office until 1979. In December 1979, he was promoted to become deputy governor of Sichuan, a position he held until March 1981.

He was appointed party secretary of Tibet Autonomous Region in December 1980, concurrently serving as vice chairman of Tibet Autonomous Region and chairman of the Tibet Autonomous Regional Committee of the Chinese People's Political Consultative Conference.

He became vice chairman of the Sichuan Provincial Committee of the Chinese People's Political Consultative Conference in May 1986, and served until January 1998.

References

1931 births
Living people
Tibetan politicians
People from Batang County
People's Republic of China politicians from Sichuan
Chinese Communist Party politicians from Sichuan
Delegates to the 7th National People's Congress
Alternate members of the 12th Central Committee of the Chinese Communist Party